Brigadier-General Guy Melfort Baldwin  (22 March 1865 – 22 March 1945) was a British cavalry officer in the British Indian Army where he commanded the 25th Cavalry (Frontier Force) and later the Derajat Brigade.

Early life
Guy Melfort Baldwin was born 22 March 1865 at Penang, to Colonel A T and Margaret Baldwin. He was educated in Scotland at the Royal High School, in Edinburgh, and then at Wimbledon College.

He then attended the Royal Military College, Sandhurst, graduating as the Queen's India Cadet in January 1886 and joining the Royal Irish Regiment as a second-lieutenant. Until August the same year when he transferred to The Loyal North Lancashire Regiment.

British Indian Army
In March 1888, Baldwin was seconded for service with the Indian Staff Corps, joining the 4th Punjab Infantry Regiment and serving with them in the Hazara Expedition of 1888.
Two years later in 1890 he joined the Queen's Own Corps of Guides as a lieutenant and squadron commander. He was present during the 1895 Chitral Expedition, where as part of the relief force he received a sword wound during the action at Khaar 4 April 1895. He was mentioned in dispatches and invested as a Companion of the Distinguished Service Order.
He was again wounded in November 1897, this time severely during operations in the Malakand District and Swat valley.

He was promoted to captain in April 1897, and major in February 1904. Becoming a Deputy Assistant Adjutant General in May 1905.

By the First World War he was a lieutenant-colonel commanding the 25th Cavalry (Frontier Force). In March 1915 he took part in the action at Miranshah in the Tochi Valley, was again mentioned in dispatches and was promoted to brevet colonel in October 1915. Two years later, in February 1917, he was promoted to temporary brigadier-general and commander of the Derajat Brigade. For his brigades conduct against the Mahsuds in 1917 he was once more mentioned in dispatches. His final action was during the 1919, third Afghan War, following which he retired from the army 21 August 1919, being granted the substantive rank of brigadier-general.

Family life
Baldwin married his wife Christine and lived for a time at Bexhill on Sea in Sussex and at Melfort Cottage, Yateley, in Hampshire. Their son Major Christopher Melfort Baldwin of the 1/7th Battalion, Middlesex Regiment was killed in action 1 June 1940, during the Second World War.

References

1865 births
1945 deaths
People educated at Wimbledon College
People educated at the Royal High School, Edinburgh
Graduates of the Royal Military College, Sandhurst
Indian Army cavalry generals of World War I
Companions of the Distinguished Service Order
British Indian Army officers
Royal Irish Regiment (1684–1922) officers
Loyal Regiment officers
British military personnel of the Hazara Expedition of 1888
British military personnel of the Chitral Expedition
Corps of Guides (India) officers
British military personnel of the Malakand Frontier War